This is a list of United Nations Security Council Resolutions 1401 to 1500 adopted between 28 March 2002 and 14 August 2003.

See also 
 Lists of United Nations Security Council resolutions
 List of United Nations Security Council Resolutions 1301 to 1400
 List of United Nations Security Council Resolutions 1501 to 1600

1401